Feel What U Feel is a children's album by American musician Lisa Loeb. The album was released on October 7, 2016, and the album's first single was "Feel What U Feel." The album won Best Children's Album at the 60th Annual Grammy Awards.

Release 
The album was announced on September 8, 2016 with the release of the lead single "Feel What U Feel," featuring Craig Robinson. The album was then released by Furious Rose Productions on October 7, 2016 as an Amazon Music exclusive.

Promotion 
Lisa Loeb Embarked a small tour to promote the Children's album in the Fall of 2016 & Winter of 2017. Despite going on a children's tour, Lisa performed many of her "Adult" and "Older" songs. Lisa also constantly played her songs on "Kids Place Live Radio" for nearly 1 year after release.

Singles 
"Feel What U Feel" was released as the album's lead single of September 8, 2016. The second single, "Moon Star Pie (It's Gonna Be Alright)"  was released on October 7, 2016. The third single, "Wanna Do Day" ft. Ed Helms was released on January 12, 2017. The fourth and final single of the album, "The Sky Is Always Blue" was released on March 13, 2017.

Track listing

References 

2016 albums
Children's music albums by American artists
Lisa Loeb albums